is a Japanese footballer for Lampang in Thai League 2.

Career statistics

Club

Notes

Honour
Thai Honda
Thai Division 1 League: 2016

References

1986 births
Living people
Japanese footballers
Japanese expatriate footballers
Association football defenders
Sagawa Shiga FC players
Yuki Bamba
Yuki Bamba
Yuki Bamba
Yuki Bamba
Yuki Bamba
Yuki Bamba
Yuki Bamba
Yuki Bamba
Yuki Bamba
Yuki Bamba
Japanese expatriate sportspeople in Thailand
Expatriate footballers in Thailand